Ray Hackett Racing (RHR) was a stock car racing team owned by Ray Hackett. The team competed from 2005 to 2012, fielding entries in the NASCAR Nationwide Series, NASCAR Camping World Truck Series and ARCA Re/Max Series. Ryan Hackett started the majority of the races the team competed in.

Nationwide Series
The team made its NASCAR Nationwide Series debut at Richmond International Raceway, where Ryan Hackett finished 35th. Hackett failed to qualify at Nashville Superspeedway and Bristol Motor Speedway later that year.

On April 4, 2009, RHR announced plans for a limited NASCAR Nationwide Series schedule, starting at Nashville Superspeedway with Hackett behind the wheel. He failed to qualify at Nashville and did not attempt a Nationwide race for the rest of the season.

Hackett failed to qualify in his only attempt of the 2010 season, which came at Bristol Motor Speedway.

For 2012, the team moved into a new race shop in Salisbury, North Carolina and signed Donnie Neuenberger to drive the season-opening race at Daytona International Speedway. He failed to qualify.

Camping World Truck Series

No. 75 history
A second RHR entry, Ryan Mathews drove the No. 75 in two events in 2009 with a best finish of 25th.

No. 76 history
RHR made its NASCAR Camping World Truck Series debut in the 2008 season finale, where Ryan Hackett finished 34th at Homestead-Miami Speedway.

Hackett drove seven races in 2009, and recorded a top-twenty finish at Charlotte Motor Speedway.

In 2010, Hackett drove the first two races of the season for the team. RHR then signed Brian Johnson Jr. to a two-race deal after seeing him race in the Toyota All-Star Showdown in January. Johnson drove for the team at Martinsville Speedway and Nashville Superspeedway. The team later signed Truck Series veteran Rick Crawford to drive the No. 76 at Kansas Speedway. A potential full-time schedule was disrupted by sponsorship issues after five races.

Before the 2011 season, RHR signed Alli Owens to run the season-opening race at Daytona International Speedway. Owens failed to make the field by five spots. Hackett made the team's only other 2011 attempt, finishing 22nd at Talladega Superspeedway.

The team's only race in 2012 was with Hackett driving at Talladega; he finished 17th.

ARCA Re/Max Series
Ryan Hackett drove six ARCA Re/Max Series races for the team between 2005 and 2008, scoring a best race finish of 12th.

References

External links
 Team Website
 Ray Hackett Owner Statistics

Defunct NASCAR teams